Samuel Colgate (March 22, 1822 – April 23, 1897), son of William Colgate, was an American manufacturer and philanthropist, born in New York City. When William Colgate died in 1857, Samuel took over the business (he did not want to continue the business but thought it would be the right thing to do), reorganizing it as Colgate & Company. In 1872, Samuel introduced Cashmere Bouquet, the world’s first milled perfumed toilet soap. Then in 1873, Colgate introduced its first Colgate Toothpaste, an aromatic toothpaste sold in jars. In 1896, the company sold its first toothpaste in a collapsible tube (which had recently been invented by dentist Washington Sheffield), named Colgate Ribbon Dental Cream. Also in 1896, Colgate hired Martin Ittner and under his direction founded one of the first applied research labs. The manufactory he built in Jersey City developed into one of the largest establishments of its kind in the world and is now part of Colgate-Palmolive.

He was also prominent in philanthropic work.  For more than 30 years he was trustee of Colgate University, and for many years he was president of the New York Baptist Education Society, president of the Society for the Suppression of Vice, and a member of the executive committee of the American Baptist Missionary Union and of the American Tract Society.  One of his most noteworthy achievements was the collection of 30,000 volumes of reports (now at the American Baptist Historical Society), comprising the documentary records of the Baptist denomination.

Colgate built a home in Orange, New Jersey, where he died on April 23, 1897, due to heart issues. He is interred in Orange's Rosedale Cemetery.

Colgate University
Conjointly with his brother, James Boorman Colgate, he gave large sums to Colgate University, which in 1890 was named in honor of the Colgate family.  His son, Samuel Colgate, Jr. became the first head football coach at the school.

 Samuel Colgate was ranked to manager of Colgate soap and perfumes after the death of his father, William Colgate, owner of the company. later, Samuel Colgate renamed the company "Colgate and Co."

References

External links
 

1822 births
1897 deaths
19th-century American philanthropists
American manufacturing businesspeople
Businesspeople from New York City
Philanthropists from New York (state)
19th-century American businesspeople
Colgate family
Baptists from New York (state)
Burials at Rosedale Cemetery (Orange, New Jersey)
People from Orange, New Jersey